Daniel Marquis (1829–1879) was an early portrait photographer in Brisbane, Australia.  Marquis was born in Glasgow, Scotland, where he had a studio as a professional photographer at 32 King Street, Stirling.

He went to Australia in 1865 and was given a land grant at Kangaroo Point, Queensland.  He set up his photographic studio in 82 George Street, Brisbane, from 1866 to 1880.  He died in Brisbane.

Marquis had commissions to photograph leading members of society, for example the Governor of Queensland, Samuel Wensley Blackall, and Judge Alfred Lutwyche.

References 

Australian photographers
Photographers from Queensland
19th-century Scottish photographers
1829 births
1879 deaths
19th-century Australian photographers